Royal chapel or Chapel Royal may refer to:

Capela Real, Portugal
Capilla flamenca, Spanish royal court
Chapel Royal, royal chapels in the British Commonwealth:
 Chapel Royal, Brighton, former Chapel Royal, United Kingdom
 Chapel Royal (Dublin Castle), former Chapel Royal, United Kingdom
 Chapel Royal (Hampton Court Palace), United Kingdom
 Chapel Royal (St. James's Palace), United Kingdom
 Christ Church Royal Chapel, Deseronto, Canada
 Church of St Peter ad Vincula, London, United Kingdom
 Mohawk Chapel, Her Majesty's Royal Chapel of the Mohawks, Brantford, Canada
 Queen's Chapel, St. James's Palace, United Kingdom
 Royal Chapel of St Katherine-upon-the-Hoe, Plymouth, United Kingdom
 Savoy Chapel, London, United Kingdom
 St John's Chapel, London, United Kingdom
Chapel Royal of Naples, Italy
Chapelle royale, France
La Capella Reial de Catalunya, Catalan music ensemble
Royal Chapel of Granada, Spain Capilla Real
Royal Chapel (Sweden) Slottskyrkan

See also
Capilla Real (disambiguation)
Court chapel (disambiguation)